Burn After Reading is a 2008 black comedy spy film written, produced, edited and directed by Joel and Ethan Coen. It follows a recently jobless CIA analyst, Osbourne Cox (John Malkovich) whose misplaced memoirs are found by a pair of dimwitted gym employees (Frances McDormand and Brad Pitt). When they mistake the memoirs for classified government documents, they undergo a series of misadventures in an attempt to profit from their find. The film also stars George Clooney as a womanizing U.S. Marshal; Tilda Swinton as Katie Cox, the wife of Osbourne Cox; Richard Jenkins as the gym manager; and J. K. Simmons as a CIA supervisor.

The film premiered on August 27, 2008, at the Venice Film Festival. It was released in the United States on September 12, 2008, and in the United Kingdom on October 17, 2008. It performed well at the box office, grossing over $163 million from its $37 million budget. Critical response was mostly positive, and the film received nominations at both the Golden Globes and British Academy Film Awards.

Plot
Faced with a demotion due to a drinking problem, Osbourne Cox angrily quits his job as a CIA analyst and decides to write a memoir. When his pediatrician wife Katie finds out, she sees it as an opportunity to file for divorce and to continue an affair with Harry Pfarrer, a married U.S. Marshal with paranoid tendencies. At the instruction of her lawyer, Katie delivers a copy of her husband's digital financial records and other files, unknowingly including the draft of Ozzie's memoir. The lawyer's assistant copies the files onto a CD, which she accidentally leaves on the locker room floor of Hardbodies, a local gym. The disc falls into the hands of personal trainer Chad Feldheimer and his coworker Linda Litzke, who mistakenly believe it contains sensitive government information.

Chad and Linda devise a plan to return the disc to Osbourne for a reward; Linda is eager to raise money for cosmetic surgery. However, their efforts only enrage him. Chad and Linda try to sell the disc to the Russian embassy, meeting with an official who is actually a spy for the CIA. Osbourne's erratic behavior prompts Katie to change the locks on their house and to invite Harry to move in. Harry is a womanizer and routinely dates women he meets online; he starts seeing Linda after meeting her on a dating site.

Having promised the Russians more files, Linda persuades Chad to sneak into the Osbourne house to steal files from Osbourne's computer. Chad is discovered by Harry, who shoots him dead. Harry searches the body for clues, but finds an empty wallet and missing suit tags; he surmises that Chad was working for the CIA. At the CIA headquarters, Osbourne's former superior and a director learn that information from Osbourne has been given to the Russian embassy. They are perplexed because the information is of no importance and the perpetrators' motive is unknown. The director orders that Chad's death be covered up.

Harry realizes that he is being tailed by a divorce lawyer hired by his wife. Depressed, Harry meets with Linda, who is distressed over Chad's disappearance. Harry agrees to help find him, unaware that Chad is the man he killed. Linda returns to the embassy, believing that the Russians have abducted Chad, but they deny this. After they inform her the contents of the CD she has given them are worthless, she convinces the manager of Hardbodies, Ted (who has unrequited feelings for Linda), to help her by sneaking into the Osbourne household to gather more files.

Harry and Linda meet in a park, where Linda reveals the address where Chad went before he disappeared. Harry realizes that Chad is the man he shot and flees, convinced Linda is a spy. When Osbourne breaks into Katie's house to retrieve personal belongings, he finds Ted in the basement; Osbourne shoots him, chases him into the street, and kills him with a hatchet.

At the CIA headquarters, Osbourne's former superior informs the director of the events. A surveilling CIA officer who saw Osbourne's attack shot him, leaving him in a coma. Harry has been detained while trying to flee to Venezuela, a country with no extradition treaty with the U.S.; the director orders to let Harry continue to Venezuela rather than deal with the consequences of bringing him into custody. Linda has been captured but has agreed to keep quiet if they will pay for her plastic surgery. The director, bewildered, approves the payment and closes the file.

Cast

 George Clooney as Harry Pfarrer
 Frances McDormand as Linda Litzke
 Brad Pitt as Chad Feldheimer
 John Malkovich as Osbourne Cox
 Tilda Swinton as Katie Cox
 Richard Jenkins as Ted
 Elizabeth Marvel as Sandy Pfarrer
 David Rasche as CIA Officer Palmer DeBakey Smith
 J. K. Simmons as CIA superior
 Olek Krupa as Krapotkin
 Jeffrey DeMunn as Cosmetic Surgeon

Production

Background and writing
Working Title Films produced the film for Focus Features, which also has worldwide distribution rights. Burn After Reading was the first Coen brothers film not to use Roger Deakins as cinematographer since Miller's Crossing. Emmanuel Lubezki, four-time Academy Award-nominated cinematographer of Sleepy Hollow and Children of Men, took over for Deakins, who had already committed to shooting Sam Mendes' Revolutionary Road. Mary Zophres served as costume designer, marking her eighth consecutive movie with the Coen brothers. Carter Burwell, a composer who worked with the Coens in 11 previous films, created the score. Early in the production, Burwell and the Coens decided that the score should be emphatically percussive to match the deluded self-importance of the characters, and they noted the all-drum score for the political thriller Seven Days in May. Joel Coen wanted the score to be "big and bombastic,... important sounding but absolutely meaningless." Burwell wrote that a percussive score would help "avoid any emotional comment" and "would lend an air of sobriety, gravity, and bombast to the general silliness". The Burn score ultimately made frequent use of Japanese Taiko drums.

Burn After Reading was the first original screenplay penned by Joel and Ethan Coen since their 2001 film, The Man Who Wasn't There. Ethan Coen compared Burn After Reading to the Allen Drury political novel Advise and Consent and called it "our version of a Tony Scott/Jason Bourne kind of movie, without the explosions." Joel Coen said that they intended to create a spy film because "we hadn't done one before", but feels that the final result was more of a character-driven film than a spy story. Joel also said that Burn After Reading was not meant to be a comment or satire on Washington.

Parts of the Burn screenplay were written while the Coens were also writing their adaptation of No Country for Old Men. The Coens created characters with actors George Clooney, Brad Pitt, Frances McDormand, John Malkovich and Richard Jenkins in mind for the parts, and the script derived from the brothers' desire to include them in a "fun story." Ethan Coen said that Pitt's character was partially inspired by a botched hair-coloring job from a commercial that Pitt had made. Tilda Swinton, who was cast later than were the other actors, was the only major actor whose character was not written specifically for her. The Coens struggled to develop a common filming schedule to accommodate the A-list cast.

Production Weekly, an online entertainment-industry magazine, falsely reported in October 2006 that Burn After Reading was a loose adaptation of Burn Before Reading: Presidents, CIA Directors, and Secret Intelligence, a memoir by former U.S. Director of Central Intelligence Stansfield Turner. The Coen brothers script had nothing to do with the Turner book; nevertheless, the rumor was not clarified until a Los Angeles Times article more than one year later.

Filming
Principal photography took place around Brooklyn Heights, as the Coens wanted to stay in New York City to be with their families. Other scenes were filmed in Paramus, New Jersey, Westchester County, New York and Washington, D.C., particularly in the Georgetown neighborhood. Filming began on August 27, 2007, and was completed on October 30, 2007. John Malkovich, appearing in his first Coen brothers film, said of the shooting, "The Coens are very delightful: smart, funny, very specific about what they want but not overly controlling, as some people can be."

Festival run and press tour
The film opened the Venice Film Festival in August 2008.

The Coen brothers said idiocy was a major central theme of Burn After Reading; Joel said he and his brother have "a long history of writing parts for idiotic characters" and described Clooney and Pitt's characters as "dueling idiots." Burn After Reading is the third of four Coen brothers films with Clooney (O Brother, Where Art Thou?, Intolerable Cruelty and, later, Hail, Caesar!), who acknowledged that he usually plays a fool in their movies: "I've done three films with them and they call it my trilogy of idiots." Joel said after the last scene was shot, "George said: 'OK, I've played my last idiot!' So I guess he won't be working with us again."

Pitt, who plays a particularly unintelligent character, said of his role, "After reading the part, which they said was hand-written for myself, I was not sure if I should be flattered or insulted." Pitt also said when he was shown the script, he told the Coens he did not know how to play the part because the character was such an idiot: "There was a pause, and then Joel goes...'You'll be fine'."

During a fall movie preview, Entertainment Weekly wrote that Malkovich "easily racks up the most laughs" among the cast as the foul-mouthed and short-tempered ex-CIA man. The first scene Malkovich performed was a phone call in which he shouts several obscenities at Pitt and McDormand. But Malkovich could not be on the sound stage for the call because he was rehearsing a play, so he called in the lines from his apartment in Paris. Regarding the scene, Malkovich said, "It was really late at night and I was screaming at the top of my lungs. God knows what the neighbors thought." Swinton plays Malkovich's wife who engages in an affair with Clooney, although the two characters do not get along well. Clooney's and Swinton's characters also had a poor relationship in their previous film together, Michael Clayton, prompting Clooney to say to Swinton at the end of a shoot, "Well, maybe one day we'll get to make a film together when we say one nice thing to each other." Swinton said of the dynamic, "I'm very happy to shout at him on screen. It's great fun."

Swinton described Burn After Reading as "a kind of monster caper movie" and said of the characters, "All of us are monsters – like, true monsters. It's ridiculous." She also said, "I think there is something random at the heart of this one. On the one hand, it really is bleak and scary. On the other, it is really funny. ... It's the whatever-ness of it. You feel that at any minute of any day in any town, this could happen." Malkovich said of the characters, "No one in this film is very good. They're either slightly emotional or mentally defective. Quirky, self-aggrandizing, scheming." Pitt said the cast did little ad-libbing because the script was so tightly written and wove so many overlapping stories together. Veteran actor Richard Jenkins said the Coen brothers asked him if he could lose weight for his role as the gym manager, to which Jenkins jokingly replied, "I'm a 60-year-old man, not Brad Pitt. My body isn't going to change."

Joel Coen said the sex machine built by Clooney's character was inspired by a machine he once saw a key grip build, and by another machine he saw in the Museum of Sex in New York City.

Release

Box office
In its opening weekend, the film grossed $19,128,001 in 2,651 theaters in the United States and Canada, ranking number one at the box office. As of July 2009, it has grossed $60,355,347 in the United States and Canada and $103,364,722 overseas adding up to $163,720,069 worldwide gross.

Critical reception
Reviews for the film were mostly positive. It earned a 78% approval rating at Rotten Tomatoes, based on 250 reviews, and an average rating of 6.90/10. The website's critical consensus states, "With Burn After Reading, the Coen Brothers have crafted another clever comedy/thriller with an outlandish plot and memorable characters." It also holds a 63/100 weighted average rating on Metacritic, based on 37 critics, indicating "generally favorable reviews".

The Times, which gave the film four out of five stars, compared it to the Coen films Raising Arizona and Fargo in its "savagely comic taste for creative violence and a slightly mocking eye for detail." The review said that the attention to detail was so impeccable that "the Coens can even raise a laugh with something as simple as a well-placed photograph of Vladimir Putin", and complimented Carter Burwell's musical score, which it described as "the most paranoid piece of film music since Quincy Jones's neurotic soundtrack for The Anderson Tapes."

Andrew Pulver, film reviewer for The Guardian, awarded the film four out of five stars, calling it "a tightly wound, slickly plotted spy comedy that couldn't be in bigger contrast to the Coens' last film, the bloodsoaked, brooding No Country for Old Men." Pulver said that the film "may also go down as arguably the Coens' happiest engagement with the demands of the Hollywood A-list."

The Hollywood Reporter reviewer Kirk Honeycutt complimented the actors for making fun of their screen personae, and said that the Coen brothers "... have taken some of cinema's top and most expensive actors and chucked them into Looney Tunes roles in a thriller." Honeycutt also said "it takes awhile to adjust to the rhythms and subversive humor of Burn because this is really an anti-spy thriller in which nothing is at stake, no one acts with intelligence and everything ends badly."

Todd McCarthy of Variety wrote a strongly negative review, saying that the film "tries to mate sex farce with a satire of a paranoid political thriller, with arch and ungainly results." McCarthy said the talented cast was forced to act like cartoon characters, described Carter Burwell's score as "uncustomarily overbearing" and said the dialogue is "dialed up to an almost grotesquely exaggerated extent, making for a film that feels misjudged from the opening scene and thereafter only occasionally hits the right note."

Time film critic Richard Corliss wrote that he did not understand what the Coen brothers were attempting with the film: "I have the sinking feeling I've made Burn After Reading sound funnier than it is. The movie's glacial affectlessness, its remove from all these subpar schemers, left me cold and perplexed."

David Denby of The New Yorker said that the film had several funny scenes, but that they "are stifled by a farce plot so bleak and unfunny that it freezes your responses after about forty-five minutes." Denby criticized the film's pattern of violence in which innocent people die quickly and the guilty go unpunished. "These people don't mean much to [the Coen brothers]; it's hardly a surprise that they don't mean much to us, either. ... Even black comedy requires that the filmmakers love someone, and the mock cruelties in Burn After Reading come off as a case of terminal misanthropy."

Leah Rozen of People said that the characters' "unrelenting dumbness and dim-witted behavior is at first amusing and enjoyable but eventually grows wearing." But Rozen said that the performances are a redeeming factor, especially that of Pitt, whom she described as a standout who "manages simultaneously to be delightfully broad and smartly nuanced."

Le Monde noticed the film's "particularly bitter image of the U.S. The alliance of political incompetence (the CIA), the cult of appearance (the gym club) and vulgar stupidity (everyone) is the target of a settling of scores" where the comedy "sprouts from a well of bitterness."

Almost a decade later, The New Republic senior editor Jeet Heer argued that the film was "singularly prophetic of the [Donald] Trump era" anticipating "the Trump campaign's collusion with Russian operatives" and "the wider culture of deceit that made Donald Trump's rise possible. More than just a satire on espionage, the movie is scathing critique of modern America as a superficial, post-political society where cheating of all sorts comes all too easily....The most disturbing thing about Burn After Reading, though, is how it resembles every day in Trump's Washington, where the line between blundering idiocy and malevolent conspiracy is increasingly blurred."

Accolades

The National Board of Review named Burn After Reading in its list of the Top 10 Movies of 2008. Noel Murray of The A.V. Club named it the second-best film of 2008, Empire magazine named it the third-best film of 2008, and Owen Gleiberman of Entertainment Weekly named it the seventh-best film of 2008.

Home media
Burn After Reading was released on Region 1 DVD and Blu-ray disc on December 21, 2008. The Region 2 version was released on February 9, 2009. The Blu-ray contains three bonus features, including behind-the-scenes footage and interviews with cast and crew.

References

External links

 
 
 
 
 
 
 Burn After Reading at Working Title Films

2008 films
American black comedy films
British black comedy films
English-language French films
French black comedy films
2000s spy comedy films
Films directed by the Coen brothers
Films set in Washington, D.C.
Films set in Virginia
Films shot in New York City
Films shot in New Jersey
Relativity Media films
StudioCanal films
Working Title Films films
Adultery in films
British drama films
Films scored by Carter Burwell
2008 black comedy films
American spy comedy films
2008 comedy films
2000s English-language films
Films set in a movie theatre
2000s American films
2000s British films
2000s French films